"Bring Yourself Back To Me" is a song written by Don Gould and Lynsey de Paul (credited as her real name "Rubin") in 1971. It was recorded by Jack Wild and released as a track on his 1971 album Everything's Coming Up Roses. It was also the B-side to his 1971 single ""Everything's Coming Up Roses" that received a "Special Merit Spotlight" singles review in Billboard. In a review of both sides of the single, Record World stated "First for label packs plenty of teen appeal". It reached number seven on the Billboard Bubbling Under chart, as well as being hit bound on KKAR radio.

References

External links
Discogs.com entry

1971 songs
1971 singles
Songs written by Lynsey de Paul
English songs
British pop songs